Sidwell Mothea (born 21 November 1977) is a Mosotho footballer who currently plays as a midfielder for Lesotho Prison Service. He won one cap for the Lesotho national football team in 2008.

External links

1979 births
Living people
Association football midfielders
Lesotho footballers
Lesotho international footballers
Lesotho Correctional Services players